The Face of Britain is a 1935 documentary by Paul Rotha. It was sponsored (uncredited) by the Central Electricity Board and included material showing how the newly built National Grid (1928–33) could play a major role in the necessary reorganisation of British industry that was also one of the themes of the film.

See also
 Hugh Quigley

References

External links 

1935 films
British documentary films
Films directed by Paul Rotha
1935 documentary films
1930s British films